Saraguro (also Sarakuru) is the capital of Saraguro Canton in Loja Province, Ecuador. The population of the parish increased from 7,346 in 2001 to 9,045 in 2010.

The Saraguro is an Indigenous people part of the Kichwa nation who inhabit the Southern Highlands in Ecuador. They are a major component of the population and culture of the town and canton of Saraguro, which other major group of inhabitants are mestizos. Their clothing is characterized in the men by the ponchos and white hats with black spots (at the moment, they used the hats with wide wing made of wool of sheep) and espadrilles; and in women by the anacos and shawls of the same color.

References

Populated places in Loja Province